The 2023 AFC U-17 Asian Cup qualification was an international men's under-17 football competition which was held to decide the participating teams of the 2023 AFC U-17 Asian Cup. It was held as under-17 tournament for the first time after rebranding by AFC.

Format changes
The AFC Executive Committee had approved several strategic recommendations put forward by the AFC Competitions Committee. One of which was the removal of zoning principles in the AFC's youth competitions.

Draw
Of the 47 AFC member associations, a total of 44 teams entered the competition. The initial final tournament hosts Bahrain decided to participate in qualification despite having automatically qualified for the final tournament before its eventual withdrawal from hosting. The draw was held on 24 May 2022.

The 44 teams were allocated to 4 groups of five teams and 6 groups of four teams, with teams seeded according to their performance in the 2018 AFC U-16 Championship final tournament and qualification (overall ranking shown in parentheses; NR stands for non-ranked teams). A further restriction was also applied, with the ten teams serving as qualification group hosts drawn into separate groups.

On 16 August, FIFA Council unanimously decided to suspend India with immediate effect due to undue influence from third parties, which constitutes a serious violation of the FIFA Statutes. On 27 August, FIFA lifted the suspension, allowing India to compete.

On 28 September, Timor-Leste withdrew from the competition, citing financial reasons. Sri Lanka withdrew from the qualification on 4 October.

Notes
Teams in bold qualified for the final tournament.
(H): Qualification group hosts
(Q): Final tournament hosts, automatically qualified regardless of qualification results
(W): Withdrew after draw

Player eligibility
Players born on or after 1 January 2006 were eligible to compete in the tournament.

Format
In each group, teams will play each other once at a centralised venue. The ten group winners and the six best runners-up will qualify for the final tournament.

Tiebreakers
Teams will be ranked according to points (3 points for a win, 1 point for a draw, 0 points for a loss), and if tied on points, the following tiebreaking criteria are applied, in the order given, to determine the rankings (Regulations Article 7.3):
Points in head-to-head matches among tied teams;
Goal difference in head-to-head matches among tied teams;
Goals scored in head-to-head matches among tied teams;
If more than two teams are tied, and after applying all head-to-head criteria above, a subset of teams are still tied, all head-to-head criteria above are reapplied exclusively to this subset of teams;
Goal difference in all group matches;
Goals scored in all group matches;
Penalty shoot-out if only two teams are tied and they met in the last round of the group;
Disciplinary points (yellow card = 1 point, red card as a result of two yellow cards = 3 points, direct red card = 3 points, yellow card followed by direct red card = 4 points);
Drawing of lots.

Groups
The matches were played between 1–9 October 2022.

Group A
All matches were held in Jordan.
Times listed are UTC+3.

Group B
All matches were held in Indonesia.
Times listed are UTC+7.

Group C
All matches were held in Oman.
Times listed are UTC+4.

Group D
All matches were held in Saudi Arabia.
Times listed are UTC+3.

Group E
All matches were held in Bangladesh.
Times listed are UTC+6.

Group F
All matches were held in Vietnam.
Times listed are UTC+7.

Group G
All matches were held in Australia.
Times listed are UTC+11.

Group H
All matches were held in Tajikistan.
Times listed are UTC+5.

Group I
All matches were held in Kyrgyzstan.
Times listed are UTC+6.

Group J
All matches were held in Uzbekistan.
Times listed are UTC+5.

Ranking of second-placed teams
Due to groups having a different number of teams, the results against the fourth-placed teams in groups with four teams, or the results against the fourth and fifth-placed teams in groups with five teams, was not considered for this ranking. 

Originally only the five best runners-up would qualify, but due to Bahrain’s withdrawal as the final tournament host, the sixth-best runner-up also qualified.

Qualified teams
A total of 16 teams including hosts qualified for the final tournament.

1 Bold indicates champions for that year. Italic indicates hosts for that year.

Goalscorers

See also
2023 AFC U-20 Asian Cup
2023 AFC U-20 Asian Cup qualification
 2023 AFC U-17 Asian Cup

Notes

References

 
U-17 Asian Cup Qualifiers
2022 in youth association football